Coderre is a surname. Notable people with the surname include:

 Denis Coderre (born 1963), politician
 Elaine Coderre (born 1947), politician
 Lionel Philias Coderre (1915–1995), merchant and politician
 Louis Coderre (1865–1935), politician

French-language surnames